Lichenoides is an extinct genus of echinoderms that lived during the Middle Cambrian in what is today the Czech Republic.

References

Cambrian echinoderms
Blastozoa genera
Fossils of the Czech Republic
Taxa named by Joachim Barrande